Electroblotting is a method in molecular biology/biochemistry/immunogenetics to transfer proteins or nucleic acids onto a membrane by using PVDF or  nitrocellulose, after gel electrophoresis. The protein or nucleic acid can then be further analyzed using probes such as specific antibodies, ligands like lectins, or stains. This method can be used with all polyacrylamide and agarose gels. An alternative technique for transferring proteins from a gel is capillary blotting.

Development
This technique was patented in 1989 by William J. Littlehales under the title "Electroblotting technique for transferring specimens from a polyacrylamide electrophoresis or like gel onto a membrane.

Electroblotting procedure
This technique relies upon current and a transfer buffer solution to drive proteins or nucleic acids onto a membrane. Following electrophoresis, a standard tank or semi-dry blotting transfer system is set up. A stack is put together in the following order from cathode to anode: sponge | three sheets of filter paper soaked in transfer buffer | gel | PVDF or nitrocellulose membrane | three sheets of filter paper soaked in transfer buffer | sponge. It is a necessity that the membrane is located between the gel and the positively charged anode, as the current and sample will be moving in that direction. Once the stack is prepared, it is placed in the transfer system, and a current of suitable magnitude is applied for a suitable period of time according to the materials being used.

Typically the electrophoresis gel is stained with Coomassie brilliant blue following the transfer to ensure that a sufficient quantity of material has been transferred. Because the proteins may retain or regain part of their structure during blotting they may react with specific antibodies giving rise to the term immunoblotting. Alternatively the proteins may react with ligands like lectins giving rise to the term affinity blotting.

See also
 Western blotting
 SDS-page

References

External links
 Protein (Western) Blotting - Introduction to Antibodies Membrane Transfer
 Detailed electroblotting to PVDF procedure - Protein Chemistry Laboratory

Protein methods
Molecular biology
Electrophoresis

ca:Western blot
de:Western Blot
es:Western blot
eo:Proteina trimoo
fr:Western blot
it:Western blot
hu:Western blot
ja:ウェスタンブロッティング
pl:Western-blot
pt:Western blot
sv:Western blot
tr:Western blot
ur:لطخۂ مغرب
zh:蛋白質轉漬法